Steve Darcis defeated Werner Eschauer 6–1, 7–6(7–1) to win the 2007 Dutch Open (tennis) singles event.

Seeds

Draw

Finals

Section 1

Section 2

External links
Singles draw
Qualifying draw

Singles